Georg Egon Bent Jensen (30 October 1925 – 4 November 2016) was a Danish rower. He competed at the 1952 Summer Olympics in Helsinki with the men's coxless pair where they were eliminated in the semi-final repechage.

References

1925 births
2016 deaths
Danish male rowers
Olympic rowers of Denmark
Rowers at the 1952 Summer Olympics
People from Sorø Municipality
European Rowing Championships medalists
Sportspeople from Region Zealand